Franz-Joseph von Seefried auf Buttenheim y Baviera, Count of Seefried (29 July 1904 – 15 May 1969) was the son of Count Otto von Seefried and his wife, Princess Elisabeth Marie of Bavaria, granddaughter of Emperor Franz Joseph I of Austria. He was known for his work as a naturalist and hunter in Spain, where he served as trade commissioner of Austria.

Marriage and issue

He married Gabrielle von Schnitzler (3 November 1918 – 13 February 2017) on 9 August 1941 in Frankfurt am Main. They had four children:
 Francisco José von Seefried auf Buttenheim y Schnitzler (born in Frankfurt am Main, 1942)
 Fernando von Seefried auf Buttenheim y Schnitzler (born in Madrid)
 Isabel von Seefried auf Buttenheim y Schnitzler (born in Madrid)
 Johannes von Seefried auf Buttenheim y Schnitzler (born in Wien, 1959)

Death
He died on 15 May 1969 in Madrid as a result of a traffic accident, after crashing against a bus. His funeral was celebrated on 14 June at Church of the Conception.

Selected works
 Cacerías de Alta Montaña, Ediciones y Publicaciones Españolas (EPESA), Madrid, 1949.

References

1904 births
1969 deaths
Austrian diplomats
People from Ružomberok
People from Madrid
Austrian naturalists
Hunters
20th-century nobility
20th-century naturalists